Luca Lai (born 24 June 1992) is an Italian sprinter.

Achievements
Senior level

National titles
Lai won a national championship.
 Italian Athletics Indoor Championships
 60 m: 2019

See also
 2020/21 in 60 metres (51st with 6.64)

References

External links

1992 births
Living people
Italian male sprinters
Sportspeople from Sardinia
People from Oristano